The Train is a 1973 Franco–Italian film directed by Pierre Granier-Deferre. The film is based on the 1961 novel of the same name by Georges Simenon.

Plot 
In May 1940 a packed train takes refugees from a French village near the Belgian border fleeing advancing German forces. The passengers include Julien, a short-sighted radio repairer, his daughter and pregnant wife. The women are assigned to a carriage for women at the front while he has to scramble into a cattle truck at the rear. There he becomes entranced by a mysterious and beautiful young woman travelling alone.

At a station, the train is split and he is separated from his wife and daughter. As his half of the train slowly continues across war-torn France, sometimes bombed and strafed by German aircraft, he and the silent woman gradually become intimate and eventually lovers. He learns that she is a German named Anna, that she is Jewish and that her husband was taken by the Nazis two years ago.

When the train finishes at La Rochelle, he gets her fresh papers as his wife. Then he discovers that his real wife and daughter are already there in a hospital with his newborn son. Anna quietly walks away through wolf-whistling German troops.

Three years later, back in his village with his family, Julien is called into the police station. A Jewish woman in the Resistance has been captured with false papers issued in La Rochelle in the name of his wife. He professes ignorance, but the inspector then calls the woman in. For a while the two pretend not to know each other, until Julien eventually gives her a last silent caress.

Cast 
 Jean-Louis Trintignant : Julien Maroyeur
 Romy Schneider : Anna Küpfer
 Maurice Biraud : Maurice
 Régine : Julie
 Nike Arrighi : Monique Maroyeur
 Serge Marquand : Le moustachu
 Franco Mazzieri : le maquignon
 Paul Amiot : François "Verdun"
 Jean Lescot : René
 Jean-Pierre Castaldi : The sergent
 Roger Ibáñez : L'étranger
 Anne Wiazemsky : La jeune mère au bébé
 Paul Le Person : Le commissaire
 Henri Attal : Le chauffeur
 Pierre Collet : Le maire

See also
The Train (1964 film) with Burt Lancaster

External links 
 

1973 films
Films based on Belgian novels
Films based on works by Georges Simenon
Films directed by Pierre Granier-Deferre
Films scored by Philippe Sarde
Films set in 1940
1970s French-language films
French romance films
Italian romance films
War romance films
Italian World War II films
Films set on trains
1970s Italian films
French World War II films
1970s French films